Ireneusz Kluczek (5 May 1940 – 29 June 2019) was a Polish sprinter. He competed in the men's 400 metres at the 1964 Summer Olympics.

References

1940 births
2019 deaths
Athletes (track and field) at the 1964 Summer Olympics
Polish male sprinters
Olympic athletes of Poland
Sportspeople from Masovian Voivodeship
People from Maków County